Several bridges by the architect Santiago Calatrava are known locally as Calatrava bridge or Calatrava's bridge. These include:

 Ponte della Costituzione, Venice, Italy
 San Francesco di Paola Bridge, Cosenza, Italy
 Bac de Roda Bridge, Barcelona, Spain
 Calatrava Bridge, a multi-way bridge in Petah Tikva, Israel
 Chords Bridge, Jerusalem, Israel